Richard Allen Lane station (formerly Allen Lane station) is a SEPTA Regional Rail station in Philadelphia. It is located at 200 West Allens Lane in the Mount Airy neighborhood and serves the Chestnut Hill West Line. The station building was built circa 1880, according to the Philadelphia Architects and Buildings project. Like many in Philadelphia, it retains much of its Victorian/Edwardian appearance. 

The former station building now houses a coffee shop, the High Point Cafe.

The station is in zone 2 on the Chestnut Hill West Line, on former Pennsylvania Railroad tracks, and is 10.1 track miles from Suburban Station. In fiscal 2012, this station saw 307 boardings on an average weekday.

The name: "Allen" vs "Allen's" vs "Allens"
Allen Lane station got its name from the adjoining street, Allens Lane, which was named for William Allen, a prominent man of colonial-era Pennsylvania. His estate, Mount Airy (from which the surrounding Mount Airy neighborhood got its name), was at the top of the hill where Allens Lane meets Germantown Avenue. (The site is now the campus of the Lutheran Theological Seminary at Philadelphia). Since at least the 19th century, there has been variation in the lane's name between "Allen", "Allen's", and "Allens". Today, through maps and signage, the names have reached a level of written codification that leaves the lane's name written consistently as "Allens" and the station's name written consistently as "Allen". Colloquially, the Allen/Allen's/Allens variation persists in local speech, such as when train conductors sometimes announce the stop as "Allen's Lane". The "Allen Lane" variation that became the codified station name may have been reinforced by a timetable printer's error—the Pennsylvania Railroad's timetables were printed by the firm of Allen, Lane & Scott. 

On February 14, 2022, Allens Lane was re-attributed to Richard Allen, (1760-1831, a minister, educator, writer, and one of America's most active and influential Black leaders) by resolution of the Philadelphia city council, facilitated by the efforts of State Rep. Chris Rabb (PA House 200th). The station was renamed to Richard Allen Lane station.

Restoration and renovation

Allen Lane station underwent a two-phase restoration and renovation project in the late 1990s and early 2000s. The first phase of work on the historic station building and shelters was completed in September 1999. The second phase, which included the construction of high level platforms, a rebuilt pedestrian overpass, and ramps for handicapped access, was completed in 2011.

In popular culture
Allen Lane station was featured as a filming location for the 1988 film The In Crowd.

Station layout

References

External links

SEPTA – Allen Lane Station
Existing Railroad Stations in Philadelphia County, Pennsylvania
Old Allen Lane PRR Station photo
2005 Rob Mandeville photo
 Allens Lane entrance from Google Maps Street View
 Station House from Google Maps Street View

SEPTA Regional Rail stations
Former Pennsylvania Railroad stations
Railway stations in the United States opened in 1880
Railway stations in Philadelphia